The following are lists of insects of Great Britain. There are more than 20,000 insects of Great Britain, this page provides lists by order.

Dragonflies and damselflies (Odonata)
 List of Odonata species of Great Britain

Grasshoppers & crickets (Orthoptera), earwigs (Dermaptera) and cockroaches (Dictyoptera)
 List of grasshoppers, crickets and allied insects recorded in Britain

Mayflies (Ephemeroptera)
List of mayflies of the British Isles

Flies (Diptera)
 List of conopid fly species of Great Britain
 List of hoverfly species of Great Britain
 List of soldierflies and allies of Great Britain

Beetles (Coleoptera)
 List of beetles of Great Britain

Bees, wasps, ants and related insects (Hymenoptera)
 List of bees of Great Britain
 List of wasps of Great Britain
 List of ants of Great Britain
 List of sawflies of the British Isles

Butterflies and moths (Lepidoptera)

 List of butterflies of Great Britain
 List of moths of Great Britain

True Bugs (Hemiptera)
 List of shield bugs recorded in Britain
 List of aquatic heteropteran bugs recorded in Britain
 List of heteropteran bugs recorded in Britain

References 

 
Fauna of Great Britain
Lists of animals of the British Isles